Academy of Our Lady and Spalding Institute were Catholic high schools across the street from each other in downtown Peoria, Illinois.

The Academy (AOL), a girls' school, traced its lineage back to 1863. The Spalding Institute (SI), the boys' school, was founded in 1899 by the Franciscan Brothers of Mountbellew, Ireland, at the invitation of John Lancaster Spalding, the first Bishop of Peoria. It was one of the communities which left that religious congregation to split off and become part of the Third Order Regular of St. Francis of Penance, based in Rome, Italy.

The schools merged into one co-educational school, Academy of Our Lady/Spalding Institute in 1973.  AOL/SI (also known as Academy/Spalding) was merged with Bergan High School to form Peoria Notre Dame High School in 1988, and the campus was closed at the end of the 1988–1989 school year.

Father Sweeney School for the Academically Gifted was also housed at the Spalding Institute building until its closure in the early 2000s. Joe Girardi is an alum of both schools, Father Sweeney middle school, and Spalding Institute high school. 

Buildings on the campus are contributing properties of the North Side Historic District.

Notable alumni

 Archbishop Fulton J. Sheen (SI, 1913) Venerable Sheen to be beatified; in his bio he recalls it run by the Brothers of Mary.
 Archbishop Gerald Thomas Bergan (SI)
 Pete Vonachen (SI)
 General Wayne A. Downing (SI)
Actor Jim Jordan (1913)
Actress Marian Driscoll Jordan (AOL 1915)
 Brigadier General Frank Rezac (SI, 1962)
 Congressman and U.S. Transportation Secretary Ray LaHood (SI, 1963)
 Congressman Darin LaHood (AOL/SI, 1986)
 USDA chemist Timothy L. Mounts
 Philadelphia Phillies manager Joe Girardi (AOL/SI)
 Jim Ardis (SI, 1977)

References

1899 establishments in Illinois
Buildings and structures in Peoria, Illinois
Education in Peoria, Illinois
Educational institutions established in 1863
Educational institutions established in 1899
Educational institutions disestablished in 1988
Defunct Catholic secondary schools in Illinois
Former high schools in Illinois
Historic district contributing properties in Illinois
Roman Catholic Diocese of Peoria
Schools in Peoria County, Illinois
National Register of Historic Places in Peoria County, Illinois